The 2019 Memphis Tigers football team represented the University of Memphis in the 2019 NCAA Division I FBS football season. The Tigers played their home games at Liberty Bowl Memorial Stadium in Memphis, Tennessee, and competed in the West Division of the American Athletic Conference. They were led by fourth-year head coach Mike Norvell through the team's win in the American Championship Game, after which he left to fill the head coaching vacancy at Florida State. It was the first outright/unshared conference championship in 50 seasons. The only teams to beat Memphis this season were both teams based in Pennsylvania (Temple, Penn State). 
Offensive line coach Ryan Silverfield was initially named head coach of the team for their bowl game, the Cotton Bowl; the interim tag was removed and he was named the new head coach of the Tigers.

Previous season
The Tigers finished the 2018 season 8–6, 5–3 in AAC play to be co–champions of the West Division. They represented the West Division in The American Championship Game where they lost to East Division champions UCF. They were invited to the Birmingham Bowl where they lost to Wake Forest.

Preseason

Award watch lists
Listed in the order that they were released

AAC media poll
The AAC media poll was released on July 16, 2019, with the Tigers predicted as repeat to win the AAC West Division  and finish in third place of AAC championship.

Personnel

Depth chart

Roster

Schedule

Schedule Source:

Game summaries

Ole Miss

Southern

at South Alabama

Navy

at Louisiana–Monroe

at Temple

Tulane

at Tulsa

SMU

at Houston

at South Florida

Cincinnati

Cincinnati (AAC Championship Game)

vs. Penn State (Cotton Bowl Classic)

Rankings

Players drafted into the NFL

References

Memphis
Memphis Tigers football seasons
American Athletic Conference football champion seasons
Memphis Tigers football